Scopula punctilineata is a moth of the family Geometridae. It was described by Warren in 1897. It is found in South Africa and Zimbabwe.

References

Moths described in 1897
punctilineata
Taxa named by William Warren (entomologist)
Moths of Africa